Annemarie Zimmermann (born 10 June 1940 in Lendersdorf) is a West German sprint canoer who competed in the 1960s. Competing in two Summer Olympics, she won two gold medals in the K-2 500 m event, earning them in 1964 and 1968.

Zimmermann also won two medals at the 1963 ICF Canoe Sprint World Championships with a gold in the K-2 500 m and a silver in the K-4 500 m events.

References

External links

1940 births
Living people
Canoeists at the 1964 Summer Olympics
Canoeists at the 1968 Summer Olympics
West German female canoeists
Olympic canoeists of the United Team of Germany
Olympic canoeists of West Germany
Olympic gold medalists for the United Team of Germany
Olympic gold medalists for West Germany
Olympic medalists in canoeing
ICF Canoe Sprint World Championships medalists in kayak

Medalists at the 1968 Summer Olympics
Medalists at the 1964 Summer Olympics
Sportspeople from Cologne (region)
People from Düren